"Gata Sin Luna" ("Moonless Cat") is a song written by Luis Ángel Márquez and performed by Puerto Rican singer Ednita Nazario on her album Pasiones (1994). It became her second number-one song on the Billboard Latin Pop Airplay chart in 1995. The song earned Nazario an ACE for "Most Outstanding Song by a Female Artist". The song has been covered by Saned Rivera  Corrine, and Sonora Tropicana.

Charts

Weekly charts

Year-end charts

See also
List of number-one Billboard Latin Pop Airplay songs of 1995

References

1994 songs
1995 singles
Ednita Nazario songs
1990s ballads
Pop ballads
Spanish-language songs
Song recordings produced by K. C. Porter